The Timor Gap is an area of the Timor Sea between Australia and Timor Island. The island is divided between independent East Timor and West Timor province of Indonesia. 

The Timor Gap is part of the Australia-East Timor border, Australia-Indonesia border, and East Timor–Indonesia border. It is 480 km (300 statute miles) wide.

History

Australia and Indonesia negotiated the border in 1972 and the Timor gap is part of the line they could not define because Portugal, who governed colonial East Timor then, declined to participate in the negotiations until the conclusion of UNCLOS negotiations,  due to the extremely complex nature of both international law and the complex geographical problems posed.

Timor Gap Treaty
Australia and Indonesia each posed different delimitation boundaries on their borders, while Portugal chose to abstain until a formal determination of an appropriate method for delimitation could be discerned.  East Timor was later invaded and annexed by Indonesia in 1975. This annexation was not recognised by the UN, the people of Timor nor by the Portuguese, who continued to see it as an illegally occupied territory. In 1989 despite more than a decade of brutal Indonesian occupation, Australia  and Indonesia agreed that Indonesia's ongoing occupation of Timor removed the need to include Portugal in any further negotiations and went on to bilaterally negotiate the Timor Gap Treaty.

On 30 August 1999 a UN sponsored referendum saw East Timor chose independence. On the 19th of January 2000 The UN Temporary Administration agency for East Timor UNTAET signed a Memorandum of Understanding with Australia to maintain the existing border agreement with Australia so as to allow continued development of the Timor Gap to ensure the financial future of the new country. The decision to maintain the historical agreement with Australia that had been negotiated by Indonesia caused great frustration to many Timorese.

Numerous negotiations to determine the ownership of the tens of billions of dollars' worth of oil and gas located on the seabed of the Timor Sea, including completing the undefined boundary known as the Timor Gap, were held between Australia and East Timor from 2002 onwards. During this time Australia and international oil companies were accused of pressuring East Timor to accept a petroleum revenue-sharing formula while deferring permanent boundary resolution and foregoing legal avenues.

Timor Sea Treaty
On its independence day, East Timor signed the Timor Sea Treaty with Australia. This treaty practically puts East Timor in the place of Indonesia in the Timor Gap Treaty, except that the ratio of revenue distribution in the Joint Petroleum Development Area, known as the Zone of Cooperation under the 1989 treaty, was changed to 90:10 in favour of East Timor. The 2002 treaty provided for the future "unitisation" - treating a gas or oil field which straddles one or several borders as one unit - of the Greater Sunrise gas field, of which only 20% was located within the JPDA while the rest was deemed to be in Australian territory. In East Timor's view, this distribution could be disputed as it did not recognise the borders, drawn between Australia and Indonesia, which placed the bulk of Greater Sunrise in Australian territory.

On 20 February 2007, East Timor's parliament agreed to ratify the agreement with Australia over the management of oil and gas resources in the Greater Sunrise field in the Timor Sea. The Australian and East Timor governments formally exchanged notes in Dili on 23 February 2007 to bring into force the two treaties that provided the legal and fiscal framework for the development of the Greater Sunrise gas field in the Timor Sea.

The notes covered the Sunrise International Unitization Agreement (Sunrise IUA) and the Treaty on Certain Maritime Arrangements in the Timor Sea (CMATS). Foreign Minister Alexander Downer, using a power invoked only six times in its history, invoked a "national interest" exemption clause to fast-track ratification of the CMATS treaty through the Parliament without scrutiny by its Joint Standing Committee on Treaties.

2018 Maritime Boundaries Treaty
On March 7, 2018, Australia and East Timor announced that a treaty had been signed regarding the border and the exploitation of the Greater Sunrise gas field. The agreed boundary would follow the median line between the two countries. The 2018 Maritime Boundaries Treaty formalized the agreement reached by Australia and Timor Leste on their maritime boundaries. The two countries had failed to reach agreement on a preferred option for development of the Sunrise/Troubadour field, and annexes to the Treaty set out procedures for achieving this. Article 3 of the 2018 treaty on maritime boundaries between Australia and Timor-Leste provides for adjustment of the continental shelf boundary between the two countries following settlement of that boundary between Indonesia and Timor-Leste. If those countries agree to an endpoint to their continental shelf boundary west of point A18 on the 1972 Seabed Treaty Boundary, the continental shelf boundary between Australia and Timor-Leste shall be adjusted so that it proceeds in a geodesic line from point TA-2 in the 2018 Treaty (at 11° 24' 00.61" South and 126° 18' 22.48" East), to point A18 (at 18 10° 37' South and 125° 41' East). The Treaty provides that this shall not come into force before the commercial depletion of the Laminaria and Corallina Fields. In the event that a continental shelf boundary agreed between Timor-Leste and Indonesia meets the 1972 Seabed Treaty boundary at a point to the west of point A18 on the 1972 Seabed Treaty Boundary, the continental shelf boundary shall be adjusted so that it proceeds in a geodesic line from point TA-11 in the 2018 Treaty (at 9° 42' 21.49" South and 128° 28' 35.97" East), to point A18. But this shall not come into force before the commercial depletion of the Greater Sunrise Fields.

References

External links
 Minding the Timor Gap from Dollars & Sense
 Robert J. King, Submission to the Senate Economics Legislation Committee on the provisions of the Timor Sea Maritime Boundaries Treaty, January 2019
 The CMATS Treaty from La'o Hamutuk Bulletin, April 2006
 Index to Articles about Timor-Leste's Oil and Gas published by the East Timorese organisation La'o Hamutuk.
 Timor Sea Justice Campaign 
 TIMOR GAP Website: www.timorgap.com 

Timor Sea
Australia–East Timor border
Australia–Indonesia border
East Timor–Indonesia border
Oil field disputes
Territorial disputes of Australia
Territorial disputes of East Timor
Territorial disputes of Indonesia